Gerhard Johan Jordaan (born ) is a South African rugby union player who played first class rugby in 2014 and 2016. His regular position is scrum-half.

References

South African rugby union players
Living people
1992 births
People from Kempton Park, Gauteng
Rugby union scrum-halves
Boland Cavaliers players
Western Province (rugby union) players
Rugby union players from Gauteng